Taipei Family is a Taiwanese sitcom about antics of two families living together in the same apartment dealing with issues such as love and friendship.

"Taipei Family" is considered to be a Taiwanese version of the hit series Family Guy. There are similarities that can be compared such as a lazy father, a loud wife, and strange daydreaming sequences that mocks Taiwan history.
This is more of a "traditional" Taiwanese sitcom, such as a loud (and obtrusive) laughter track, and cartoon-like sound effects based on the character's facial expressions.
Most of the show focuses on its dialog filled with deadpan humor.

Taiwanese comedy television series
2000s sitcoms